Landarzt Dr. Brock is a German television series.

See also
List of German television series

External links
 

German medical television series
1967 German television series debuts
1969 German television series endings
German-language television shows
Das Erste original programming